Babar Adesh is a 1995 Bangladeshi film directed by Montazur Rahman Akbar.   It stars Manna and Chompa in lead roles.

Cast
Manna
Chompa
Rani
Wasimul Bari Rajib

Soundtrack
The film's music have been composed by Sheikh Sadi Khan while the lyrics were penned by Gazi Mazharul Anwar, Ahmed Zaman Chowdhury and Munshi Wadud.  

"Buker Bhetor Achhe Mon" - Jonak Khan, Jhumu Khan 
"Ami Tomar Premer Deewana" - Andrew Kishore, Jhumu Khan
"Tomar Jonno Amar Jonmo" - Andrew Kishore, Jhumu Khan 
"Roshe Roshe Toshtosh Amar Gendari" - Runa Laila
"Shopneri Ghortare" - Jhumu Khan

References

External links
 

1995 films
Bengali-language Bangladeshi films
1990s Bengali-language films
Films scored by Sheikh Sadi Khan